Agonopterix broennoeensis is a moth of the family Depressariidae. It is found in Fennoscandia and northern Russia.

The wingspan is 19–22 mm. Adults are on wing in August.

The larvae feed on  Saussurea alpina.

References

External links
lepiforum.de

Moths described in 1920
Agonopterix
Moths of Europe